The Po Fook Hill Elevator is a funicular railway located inside the Po Fook Hill Ancestral Hall in Sha Tin, Hong Kong.

The system has two stations and single car built by Gangloff of Switzerland, the car can accommodate 10 (6 seated passengers on two wooden benches and 4 standees) and is free of charge. The car uses lift buttons operated by the passengers in the car and intercom to provide communication if there are operating issues.

See also 
 List of funicular railways

References

External links 
 Video: See near end of Po Fook Hill Ancestral Hall clip.

Funicular railways in Hong Kong
Buildings and structures in Hong Kong
Sha Tin